Lucía Marte León (born 14 August 1997), known as Lucia León, is a Spanish-born Dominican professional footballer who plays as a right back for Liga F club Real Betis and the Dominican Republic women's national team.

León scored Tottenham’s first ever Women's Super League goal against Arsenal in the 2020 North London Derby.

Club career

Tottenham Hotspur 
León joined Tottenham Hotspur in 2013 as a youth. During the 2018-19 FA Women's Championship, she played in 17 games, including six starts.

Speaking in 2020 during an interview regarding footballing culture, León revealed how far Tottenham Women had come as a club since she joined in 2013. Expressing how much of a positive impact being able to train as a full-time professional club had made.

References

External links 
 Tottenham Hotspur player profile
 
 

1997 births
Living people
Citizens of the Dominican Republic through descent
Dominican Republic women's footballers
Women's association football fullbacks
Tottenham Hotspur F.C. Women players
Women's Super League players
FA Women's National League players
Dominican Republic women's international footballers
Dominican Republic expatriate women's footballers
Dominican Republic expatriates in the United Kingdom
Expatriate women's footballers in England
Footballers from Madrid
Spanish women's footballers
Madrid CFF players
Primera División (women) players
Spanish people of Dominican Republic descent
Sportspeople of Dominican Republic descent
Spanish expatriate women's footballers
Spanish expatriate sportspeople in England